Seven Little Monsters is a children's picture book by American author and illustrator Maurice Sendak. Published by Harper & Row in 1977, it was originally created as an animated short for Sesame Street in 1971 and served as the basis for the Canadian-Chinese-Filipino PBS Kids show of the same name (2000–2003).

Description
Seven Little Monsters is a small format book measuring 8 1/2 by 4 1/2 inches (22 cm x 11.5 cm).

Plot
Seven giant monsters, each named as a number, One through Seven, line up together in the first frame and then start causing mischief. One flies, Two uses his long nose to dig a hole, Three scares a town, Four eats tulip trees, Five drinks the seas, Six sleeps on houses, and Seven unscrews his head. The final frame shows the giant monsters captured and restrained by the relatively tiny townspeople.

See also

1977 in literature
Children's literature

References

1977 children's books
American picture books
Fiction about monsters
Picture books by Maurice Sendak